Rob Lioy, known as Access to Arasaka, is an American electronic musician from Rochester, New York.

Style 
Started as a DJ mostly focused on progressive house and drum'n'bass, he then switched to ambient and IDM, got influenced by Autechre (especially their album Amber), Brothomstates, Venetian Snares, Boards of Canada, Orbital and The Future Sound of London.

Nowadays the artist describes his music as "a mixture of every influence I’ve ever had, past and present. As the general idea of this project is a way to describe the future I anticipate, the sounds and styles themselves are an homage to every song that has already taken me there".

Discography

Albums
2007 METAX
2009 Oppidan
2010 void();
2011 Geosynchron
2017 Reports from the Abyss
2021 l a k e s

Singles and EPs
2006 Korova
2007 A Sky Now Starless
2007 Cassiopeia
2007 Vessel
2007 :Port
2010 ==null
2011 Orbitus
2011 Aleph
2013 Écrasez l'infâme
2021 telinit 6

References

External links 

accesstoarasaka.com - official website

Living people
Year of birth missing (living people)
Musical groups from Rochester, New York
American electronic musicians
Place of birth missing (living people)